John Packer is an English bishop.

John Packer may also refer to:

John Black Packer (1824–1891), American politician
John Hayman Packer (1730–1806), British actor
John Packer (chemist) (1899–1971), New Zealand chemistry professor and prominent administrator at the University of Canterbury